In the biblical story of Adam and Eve, coats of skin (coat of skin) were the aprons provided to Adam and Eve by God when they fell from a state of innocent obedience under Him to a state of guilty disobedience.

Genesis 3:21 
As per the biblical interpretation of Genesis  3:21, God produced coats of skin for the first man and woman Adam and Eve and clothed them when they were found naked in the garden after eating the forbidden fruit.

Material 
The material of coats is not clear; instead, it is dubious. The Bible translates "coats" of skin and "garments" of skin as our mortal skin and animal' skin.

Symbolic 
If clothes were of animal skin, the question arises, who killed the animal and what was that? These ''garments'' of skin are resolved as a symbol of salvation.

Wisdom
The first man and woman didn't even know how to dress properly. Their fig-leaf aprons served no purpose. In their "shame" the first couple always found it necessary to hide themselves from God (Gen.3.8).

God's creation of the "coats of skins" can thus be seen as a sign of his superior wisdom, his recognition of his people' true needs in light of their impending expulsion from the Garden.

Gallery

See also
Biblical clothing
Books of the Bible
Snakeskin

References 

Christian mythology
Clothing
Book of Genesis
Garden of Eden